Metal prices (metal commodities) are only for a few metals quoted on exchanges. Only aluminium alloy, aluminium, copper, lead, nickel, tin, zinc and Nasaac (North American special aluminium alloy) are exchange traded commodities. Other metals (like bismuth, selenium, tellurium, and many others) are traded on market demand and the buyers/sellers themselves set the price.

The London Metal Exchange which trades the commodities mentioned above is planning to add trading contracts for cobalt and molybdenum in the course of 2009/2010.

Contracts traded on metal exchanges are also called futures contracts.

Pricing providers
There are companies which provide a pricing service set the price by talking to producers, traders and consumers. These prices are more an indication than an actual exchange price.

Unlike the prices on an exchange, pricing providers tend to give a weekly or bi-weekly price. For each commodity they quote a range (low and high price) which reflect the buying and selling about 9-fold due to China's transition from light to heavy industry and its focus on manufacturing. (China became the world's largest consumer of iron ore in 2003, and accounts for over half of global metal consumption.)

Metal commodities
The commodities quoted have a specific grade and quality of the forms in which they are most often traded.

An example:

Cobalt is an important export product of Russia and therefore the Russian quality is often traded. Another form of cobalt crucial to the aerospace industry is a high grade form of cobalt with 99.8% purity.

References 

Commodity markets
Metal industry